Ustaritz is a town in the traditional Basque province of Labourd, now a commune in the Pyrénées-Atlantiques department, southwestern France. Ustaritz station has rail connections to Saint-Jean-Pied-de-Port, Cambo-les-Bains and Bayonne.

Ustaritz was the location of the assembly of local Basque leaders before the French Revolution. The 19th-century French playwright and historian Jean-Joseph Ader (1796–1859) was born in Ustaritz.

Population

See also
Communes of the Pyrénées-Atlantiques department

References

External links

 UZTARITZE in the Bernardo Estornés Lasa - Auñamendi Encyclopedia (Euskomedia Fundazioa) Information available in Spanish

Communes of Pyrénées-Atlantiques
Pyrénées-Atlantiques communes articles needing translation from French Wikipedia